Werner Alfred Waldemar von Janowski, (Abwehr-codenamed "Bobbi"; Allied-codenamed WATCHDOG), was a captured German Second World War Nazi spy and the Royal Canadian Mounted Police's first double agent. He is believed to have been a triple agent by some, underscoring the RCMP's inexperience in espionage.
Due to power struggles between the Canadian and British intelligence agencies during the Second World War and the RCMP's inexperience, Operation Watchdog was a failure. Janowski provided little significant intelligence to the Allies: no Abwehr agents were arrested and no U-boats were captured, despite his apparent cooperation. Within a year the operation was shut down and Janowski was sent to a prison in Britain.

Espionage career
Janowski disembarked from the  submarine at Chaleur Bay, four miles (6.4 km) west of New Carlisle, Quebec, around 5 a.m., on November 9, 1942. His destination was Montreal, having first to stop in New Carlisle so he could take the first train out.

At 6:30 a.m., under the alias of William Brenton, Janowski checked in at Hotel New Carlisle asking for a room with a bath. The son of the hotel owner, Earle Annett Jr., grew suspicious of him, due to inconsistencies with the German spy's story. The man said he took the bus that morning before walking to the hotel, but the bus was not going through New Carlisle that day, and even if it had, it would have dropped him off at the hotel. Annett also noticed that he spoke English with a Parisian accent, his clothing had European styling, and that he paid for his cigarettes with an obsolete Canadian dollar bill that had not been in circulation for quite some time. The stranger also had a strange smell on him; he was using Belgian matches that did not carry the Canadian government seal that was applied to matchbooks at the time. Less than three hours after his arrival and before Annett could confirm his suspicions, the stranger paid his bill and made his way to the train station where he had a coffee while waiting for the next train.

Annett followed him to the station, sat down beside him, and offered some cigarettes. Von Janowski lit the cigarette using the same Belgian matches he had at the hotel. Annett grew even more suspicious and alerted 
Constable Alfonse Duchesneau of the Quebec Provincial Police, who boarded the train car just as it was leaving the station. Duchesneau intercepted Janowski, who maintained he was William Brenton, a radio salesman from Toronto. He stuck with this story until the policeman asked to search his bags; Janowski immediately said to Duchesneau, "Searching my luggage won't be necessary. I am a German officer who serves his country as you serve yours." Inspection of von Janowski's personal effects upon his arrest revealed that he was carrying a powerful radio transmitter, among other things.

After his capture and interrogation, the Canadian military attempted to locate the German submarine in which Janowski had arrived. Despite an extensive search of Chaleur Bay, both the warship HMCS Burlington and assisting Royal Canadian Air Force aircraft were unable to locate U-518.

In late August 1943, Janowski was sent to England, where he was incarcerated at Camp 020. He remained there for the duration of the war. He was repatriated to an internment camp in the British Zone of Germany in July 1945.

Later life
Released in 1947, Janowski had no home to return to, as Allenstein and most of East Prussia had been annexed by Poland and its population expelled. He eventually found work as a translator, and in the 1960s worked for the German Navy. Janowski died in Spain in 1978 while on a holiday.

References 

World War II spies for Germany
Canadian spies
Year of birth missing
1978 deaths
People from Olsztyn
People from East Prussia